The 2013 Women's Junior Volleyball World Championship was held in Czech Republic, for ten days between from 21 to 30 June 2013. This was the first edition of the tournament that features 20 teams.



Qualification process

Competition Formula

The 20 teams will be divided into four pools of five teams each and will play a round-robin tournament. The bottom-ranked team of each pool will play classification matches for 17th-20th place in a round-robin system.

The other 16 teams progress to the Eight Finals which consists of a playoff (1st of Pool A against 4th of Pool B etc.). The winners of the playoff matches will advance to the quarterfinals, semifinals and finals to be classified from 1st to 8th while the losers of playoff match will play classification matches, with a similar quarterfinals, semifinals and finals system, to be classified from 9th to 16th.

Venues

Kajot Arena and Mestska Hala Micovych Sportu, Brno, Czech Republic.

Preliminary round

Pool A

Pool B

Pool C

Pool D

Final round

Championship Bracket

Round of 16

Quarterfinals

Semifinals

Bronze medal match

Gold medal match

5th–8th places bracket

Classification 5th and 8th

Classification 7th

Classification 5th

9th and 16th places bracket

13th and 16th places bracket

Classification 9th and 16th

Classification 13th and 16th

Classification 9th and 12th

Classification 15th

Classification 13th

Classification 11th

Classification 9th

Classification 17th and 20th

Final standing

All-Star Team

Most Valuable Player

Best Opposite

Best Outside Hitters

Best Middle Blockers

Best Setter

Best Libero

See also
 2013 FIVB Men's Junior World Championship.

References

FIVB Volleyball Women's U20 World Championship
International volleyball competitions hosted by the Czech Republic
2013 in Czech sport
FIVB Volleyball Women's U20 World Championship
Volleyball in the Czech Republic
2013 in youth sport